Harry Harding (born 16 June 1990 in Ipswich, Queensland, Australia), also known as Hazza Harding and simply his stage name Hazza, is a journalist, television presenter, radio host and singer previously based in China. His debut single, "Let Go", was released on iTunes 8 August 2012, along with a music video that was shot in Australia. Hazza won "Most Popular Internet Celebrity 2011" at the 56.com Short film awards ceremony in Beijing. On November 23, 2020, Hazza announced via his Twitter account that his single "I Was Wrong" had peaked at No.5 on a national music chart in China, broadcast on more than 25 radio stations across mainland China, Hong Kong and Macao. Hazza stepped down as host of Guangdong Report on August 31, 2022, the same day that the OHCHR Assessment of human rights concerns in the Xinjiang Uyghur Autonomous Region, People's Republic of China, was issued.

Journalism and presenting
Hazza worked as a presenter at Guangdong Radio and Television (previously Guangdong TV), where he has hosted the talk show FaceTime from 2012 to 2021, with a short break during a stint at HKSTV. He also featured on various programmes for the network after his tenure on HKSTV during 2014 to 2016, and  anchored news programmes such as The Guangdong Report and Guangdong News Now, plus live specials for the network through 2022.

In 2017, Hazza won first prize at China News Award, a prestigious national-level award presented to outstanding journalists in the country, for his work on a radio feature report about innovative companies of Guangdong province and its connections with Australia. He has also regularly published articles for Xinhua News Agency since late 2017.

Commenting on China's response of the Brereton Report, Hazza commented on a tweet on Twitter that he had considered for the first time "relinquishing his Australian citizenship"; he also apologised to the Chinese foreign ministry spokesman Zhao Lijian in the tweet for Australia's emotional response to a graphic posted on Twitter. He has since clarified via media interviews that he is a patriotic Australian, and Chinese media called the comment "the highest act of love for one's country."

Aside from his work in China, Hazza has also worked with a number of Australian television channels, including ABC Australia and 7two,  with episodes listed on the Freeview (Australia) website.

Music
Hazza began his music career by posting cover songs to popular Chinese video sharing websites. Combined, Hazza's videos have received in excess of 100 million hits. In June 2012, Hazza recorded his debut single, "Let Go". The single was released later that year on iTunes, and peaked at #1 on the local radio music charts in Guangzhou, and stayed in the top ten for 11 weeks. The second single, a collaboration with Chinese singer-songwriter Wu Huan, "No Worries", was released on 28 October 2014 and peaked at #3 on local radio charts. His third single, "Mr Gentleman", was released on 2015. On November 23, 2020, Hazza announced via his Twitter account that his single "I Was Wrong," a song about a personal breakup, had peaked at No.5 on a national music chart in China, broadcast on more than 25 radio stations across mainland China, Hong Kong and Macao. In a recent interview, Hazza announced we was working on a new single set for release late 2022.

Personal life
Hazza grew up in Ipswich, Australia and attended West Moreton Anglican College where he was school captain.  Hazza completed his Bachelor of Arts in Applied Linguistics at Griffith University.

Awards and nominations

References

External links
Hazza's official website

1990 births
Australian musicians
Australian television presenters
Chinese television presenters
Chinese male singers
Australian expatriates in China
Australian television personalities
Living people
21st-century Australian singers
21st-century Australian male singers
21st-century Chinese male singers